Le tatoué, also known as The Million dollar tattoo, or The Tattoo, or The tattoo man, is a French-Italian comedy movie from 1968, directed by Denys de La Patellière, written by Alphonse Boudard, and starring by Jean Gabin and Louis de Funès.

Plot 
In an artist’s studio, rich Parisian art dealer Félicien Mézeray sees the old soldier Legrain, whose back has a tattoo by Modigliani. This he sells unseen to two American dealers and the rest of the film revolves around his efforts to literally get the skin off Legrain’s back. The price Legrain wants is the restoration of his old family home in the country, which turns out to be the huge crumbling castle of Paluel in remote Périgord, while he turns out to be the last and extremely eccentric Count of Montignac.
The plot bears a very strong resemblance to Saki's short story The Background.

Cast 
 Jean Gabin : Comte Enguerand, Louis, Marie de Montignac alias Legrain (legionnaire)
 Louis de Funès : Félicien Mézeray
 Paul Mercey : Maurice Pello
 Jo Warfield : Larsen
 Donald von Kurtz : Smith
 Dominique Davray : Suzanne Mézeray
 Pierre Tornade : the policeman

References

External links
 

1968 films
1968 comedy films
French comedy films
Italian comedy films
1960s French-language films
Films directed by Denys de La Patellière
1960s Italian films
1960s French films